The Winterthur–Bülach–Koblenz railway is a railway line in Switzerland. It links the city of Winterthur in the canton of Zurich with the municipality of Koblenz in the canton of Aargau. The line was opened in August 1876, by the Swiss Northeastern Railway (NOB), and is now owned by the Swiss Federal Railways.

Passenger service over the line is provided by the trains of the Zürich S-Bahn.

There is also some freight traffic on the line, including through freight between Germany and the Gotthard line over the Bülach to Eglisau section. On the rest of the line, a container terminal is served at Rekingen and a gravel mine at Zweidlen station. In addition there are several trains, principally fuel trains operating to the fuel depot at Glattbrugg station, that route from Basel to Koblenz and then use this route to bypass Zurich.

The line is constructed to standard gauge and is electrified using the Swiss standard of  supplied by overhead line. Most of the line is of single track with passing loops, but the busier section between Bülach and Eglisau is double-tracked.

References

External links

Railway lines in Switzerland